Gideon Biwott (born 26 June 1964) is a retired Kenyan athlete who specialized in the 400 metres hurdles.

He won silver medals at the 1994 Commonwealth Games and the 1995 All-Africa Games, the latter in a career best time of 49.19 seconds.

He also competed at the 1996 Olympic Games as well as the World Championships in 1991 and 1993 without reaching the final.

References

External links

1964 births
Living people
Kenyan male hurdlers
Athletes (track and field) at the 1994 Commonwealth Games
Commonwealth Games silver medallists for Kenya
Athletes (track and field) at the 1996 Summer Olympics
Olympic athletes of Kenya
Commonwealth Games medallists in athletics
African Games silver medalists for Kenya
African Games medalists in athletics (track and field)
Athletes (track and field) at the 1995 All-Africa Games
Medallists at the 1994 Commonwealth Games